When Will the World Be Mine? is a 1953 picture book written by Miriam Schlein and illustrated by Jean Charlot. The book tells the story of a curious rabbit. The book was a recipient of a 1954 Caldecott Honor for its illustrations.

References

1953 children's books
American picture books
Caldecott Honor-winning works